The southern martin (Progne elegans) is a species of bird in the family Hirundinidae.

It is found in Argentina and southern Bolivia; in winter it migrates to the western Amazon Basin.

Its natural habitats are subtropical or tropical moist lowland forest, subtropical or tropical moist montane forest, subtropical or tropical dry lowland grassland, subtropical or tropical high-altitude grassland, and urban areas.

References

southern martin
Birds of Argentina
southern martin
Taxonomy articles created by Polbot